Dorian Leon Johnson (born October 21, 1994) is an American football guard who is currently a free agent. He played college football at Pittsburgh.

High school career 
A native of Belle Vernon, Pennsylvania, Johnson attended Belle Vernon Area High School where he was a four-year varsity player and three-year starter on both the offensive and defensive line. In his junior and senior year he earned consecutive first-team All-Big Nine Conference honors.

Regarded as a four-star recruit by ESPN, Johnson was ranked as the No. 2 offensive tackle behind Laremy Tunsil. With offers from many college football programs, Johnson committed to his home-town Pittsburgh Panthers.

College career 
Johnson was a four-year starter at Pittsburgh. Dorian Johnson earned First-team All American and First-team All-ACC in 2016.

Professional career

Arizona Cardinals
Johnson was drafted in the 2017 NFL Draft. He signed a 4-year deal with a $656,388 signing bonus on May 19, 2017. On September 2, 2017, he was waived by the Cardinals and was signed to the practice squad the next day.

Houston Texans
On October 11, 2017, Johnson was signed by the Houston Texans off the Cardinals' practice squad. He was waived by the Texans on November 3, 2017 when the Texans brought in a quarterback after an injury to Deshaun Watson and was re-signed to the practice squad. He was granted release on December 27, 2017 for a family emergency.

Carolina Panthers
On January 2, 2018, Johnson was signed to the Carolina Panthers' practice squad. He signed a reserve/future contract with the Panthers on January 8, 2018.

On September 1, 2018, Johnson was waived by the Panthers and signed to practice squad the following day. He was promoted to the active roster on December 28, 2018.

On August 1, 2019, Johnson was waived/injured by the Panthers and placed on injured reserve. He was released on August 20.

DC Defenders
On November 22, 2019, Johnson was drafted by the DC Defenders in the 2020 XFL Supplemental Draft. He was waived after week 3 of the regular season in February 2020.

References

External links 

Pittsburgh Panthers bio

1994 births
Living people
American football offensive guards
Arizona Cardinals players
Carolina Panthers players
Houston Texans players
People from Fayette County, Pennsylvania
Pittsburgh Panthers football players
Players of American football from Pennsylvania
Sportspeople from the Pittsburgh metropolitan area
DC Defenders players